Oolu is an Indian Malayalam-language Fantasy film directed by Shaji N. Karun and written by T D Ramakrishnan. The film stars Shane Nigam, Indrans, Kani Kusruti, Esther Anil in the lead role; produced by A V Anoop. The film was the opening film at the 49th International Film Festival of India (2018). It was also screened at a few other major film festivals.

Cast
 Shane Nigam as Vasu  
 Esther Anil as Oolu
 Samyuktha Shanmuganathan as Shwetha
Radhika as Meenakshi
 Indrans as Abhu (Thonikkaran)
 Kani Kusruti as Manasi (Vasu's sister)
 P. Sreekumar		
 Punnassery Kanchana

Awards 
 National Film Award for Best Cinematography - M. J. Radhakrishnan

References

External links
 

Films directed by Shaji N. Karun
2018 films
2010s Malayalam-language films